Vincent Meunier is a Belgian/American condensed matter and materials physicist known for his theoretical and computational research on electronic, optoelectronic, and structural properties of low-dimensional materials. He is the Department Head and P. B. Breneman Chair and Professor in the Department of Engineering Science and Mechanics at Pennsylvania State University. Among his contributions are the quantum mechanical description of processes responsible for scanning tunneling image formation in low-dimensional materials, the development of a microscopic theory of nanocapacitors, and  contributions to the theory of electronic transport and ultra-low frequency vibrational modes in van der Waals heterostructures.  He is a Fellow of the American Physical Society (APS), of the Institute of Physics (IOP), and of the American Association for the Advancement of Science (AAAS). He is the founding Editor-in-Chief of the Open Access Elsevier journal Carbon Trends.

Education and early career
Meunier completed his high-school training in the Institut Saint-Michel in Neufchateau, Belgium in 1992. While studying at UNamur, in Namur (Belgium) he earned a B.Sc. in Physics (1996) and a M.Sc. in Physics and Chemistry of Mesoscopic Systems (1998). He then completed a Ph.D. in Physics (maxima cum laude) in 1999 as a Research Fellow supported by a FRIA scholarship from the National Fund for Scientific Research of Belgium.

Early January 2000, Meunier became a post-doctoral Fellow (2000–2002) at the Physics Department of the North Carolina State University under Jerry Bernholc and Christopher Roland, and later a research associate (2002–2004) with the Computer Science and Mathematics Division of Oak Ridge National Laboratory under the supervision of Thomas Zacharia. In April 2004, he became a R&D Staff member at Oak Ridge National Laboratory and was among the inaugural staff of the Center for Nanophase Materials Sciences (2005) at Oak Ridge where he was appointed as Senior R&D Staff member in 2009.

Later career and current positions 
In 2010, Meunier  accepted a Chaired Associate Professor (with tenure) appointment with Rensselaer Polytechnic Institute (RPI) in Troy, New York. By doing so, Meunier completed the Gail and Jeffrey L. Kodosky ’70 Constellation following Shengbai Zhang's appointment in 2008.

In January 2015, Meunier was appointed as Full Professor of Physics, Applied Physics, and Astronomy and in July 2015 he succeeded to Angel Garcia as the head of the Physics, Applied Physics, and Astronomy Department at Rensselaer Polytechnic Institute with an appointment renewed in 2018 (3 years) and in 2021 (3 years). He resigned from Rensselaer Polytechnic Institute in June 2022 and was succeeded by Gyorgy Korniss as new head of department. 

In July 2022, Meunier joined Pennsylvania State University as Department Head and P. B. Breneman Chair and Professor of Engineering Science and Mechanics in the Department of Engineering Science and Mechanics.

References 

Rensselaer Polytechnic Institute faculty
Fellows of the American Physical Society
Fellows of the Institute of Physics
Belgian physicists
1974 births
Living people